Julian Anthony Robertson (born 9 October 1969) is a former English badminton player. He competed for Great Britain at the 1996 and 2000 Summer Olympics. Robertson was a former British champion and bronze medallists at the 1998 Commonwealth Games in the men's doubles and team event. He also won the men's doubles bronze at the 1998 European Championships, and helped the team win the silver medal. He has also been involved in another 6 European championship medal winning teams. The former world No. 8 has been working as a Great Britain coach since 2004 and is one of the most decorated home grown coaches England has ever produced achieving Olympic World Commonwealth and European success with his athletes. He is based in Milton Keynes.

Personal life 
Robertson is married, has 2 children and lives in Northampton.

Achievements

Commonwealth Games 
Men's doubles

European Championships 
Men's doubles

IBF World Grand Prix 
The World Badminton Grand Prix has been sanctioned by the International Badminton Federation from 1983 to 2006.

Men's doubles

Mixed doubles

IBF International 
Men's doubles

Mixed doubles

References

External links 
 
 

1969 births
Living people
Sportspeople from Peterborough
English male badminton players
Olympic badminton players of Great Britain
Badminton players at the 2000 Summer Olympics
Badminton players at the 1996 Summer Olympics
Badminton players at the 1998 Commonwealth Games
Commonwealth Games medallists in badminton
Commonwealth Games bronze medallists for England
Badminton coaches
Medallists at the 1998 Commonwealth Games